The 2018 NCAA Division I men's soccer tournament was the 60th edition of the NCAA Division I men's soccer tournament, a postseason tournament to determine the national champion of NCAA Division I men's college soccer. The first four rounds of the competition were held at the home ground of the higher seed, while the College Cup (semifinals and final) were held at Harder Stadium on the campus of University of California, Santa Barbara. The championship match was held on December 10, 2018 with the Maryland Terrapins defeating the Akron Zips 1–0 to claim their fourth title in program history.

Maryland did not yield any goals in this year's College Cup, maintaining a clean-sheet and out-scoring opponents, 6–0. This was Sasho Cirovski's third title as the Maryland coach. The Stanford Cardinal came into this tournament as the three-time defending NCAA champions. In last year's final, Stanford defeated Indiana in extra time, 1–0. This year, however, Stanford was defeated by eventual runner-up, Akron, 3–2, in the quarterfinal.

Qualification 

As in previous editions of the NCAA Division I Tournament, the tournament features 48 participants out of a possible field of 203 teams. Of the 48 berths, 24 are allocated to the 21 conference tournament champions and to the regular season winners of the Ivy League, Pac-12 Conference, and West Coast Conference, which do not have tournaments. The remaining 24 berths are supposed to be determined through an at-large process based upon the Ratings Percentage Index (RPI) of teams that did not automatically qualify.

The NCAA Selection Committee also names the top sixteen seeds for the tournament, with those teams receiving an automatic bye into the second round of the tournament. The remaining 32 teams play in a single-elimination match in the first round of the tournament for the right to play a seeded team in the second round.

Qualified teams

Seeding

Schedule

Bracket

Regional 1 
Host Institution*

Regional 2 
Host Institution*

Regional 3 

Host Institution*

Regional 4 
Host Institution*

2018 College Cup

Results

First Round

Second Round

Third Round

Quarterfinals

College Cup

Semifinals

Championship

Statistics

Goalscorers 
7 Goals

 Marcel Zajac — Akron

4 Goals

 Amar Sejdič — Maryland

3 Goals

 Ibrahima Diop — Connecticut
 David Egbo — Akron
 Manuel Ferriol — James Madison

2 Goals

 Klint Parker — Air Force
 Timmy Mehl — Indiana
 Aaron Ward-Baptiste — James Madison
 Kalil El-Medkhar — Kentucky
 J. J. Williams — Kentucky
 Rasmus Hansen — LIU Brooklyn
 Sebastian Elney — Maryland
 Gabriel Machado — NC State
 Tyler Dickson — Rhode Island
 Nathaniel Crofts — Virginia

1 Goal

 Tucker Bone — Air Force
 Austin Dewing — Air Force
 Danny Han — Air Force
 James Sims — Air Force
 Morgan Hackworth — Akron
 Abdi Mohamed — Akron
 Braden Petno — Akron
 Carlo Ritaccio — Akron
 Alemu Mercer-Miko — Campbell
 Daniel Bruce — Charlotte
 Dean Rutherford — Charlotte
 Steven DeLeo — Colgate
 Abdou Mbacke Thiam — Connecticut
 Moshe Perez — Denver
 Issa Rayyan — Duke
 Dylan Nealis — Georgetown
 Aris Briggs — Georgia State
 Alex Summerfield — Georgia State
 Jackson Jellah — Grand Canyon
 Griffin Dorsey — Indiana
 Spencer Glass — Indiana
 Andrew Gutman — Indiana
 Logan Panchot — Indiana
 Yannick Franz — James Madison
 Carson Jeffris — James Madison
 Bailey Rouse — Kentucky
 Jason Reyes — Kentucky
 Logan Paynter — Lipscomb
 Louis Robinson — Lipscomb
 Matt Di Rosa — Maryland
 William James Herve — Maryland
 Donovan Pines — Maryland
 Noah Kleedtke — Michigan
 Hunter Barone — Michigan State
 Michael Miller — Michigan State
 Ryan Sierakowski — Michigan State
 David Norris — NC State
 Brad Sweeney — NC State
 Giovanni Montesdeoca — North Carolina
 Jack Lynn — Notre Dame
 Sofiane Djeffal — Oregon State
 Eric Diaz — Oregon State
 Anthony Orendain — Pacific
 Benji Michel — Portland
 Henry Martin — Princeton
 Chae Brangman — Rhode Island
 Pablo DeCastro — Rider
 Nicky Hernandez — SMU
 Anders Engebretsen — St. Mary's
 Tanner Beason — Stanford
 Zach Ryan — Stanford
 Massimo Ferrin — Syracuse
 Kristo Strickler — Virginia Tech
 Omir Fernandez — Wake Forest
 Justin McMaster — Wake Forest
 Logan Lucas — West Virginia
 Joey Piatczyc — West Virginia
 Jorge Quintanilla — West Virginia
 Tsubasa Takada — West Virginia

Own goals 
1 Own Goal

 Nikal Clarke-Smith — Virginia Tech (playing against James Madison)
 Esai Easley — Grand Canyon (playing against UC Irvine)

Record by conference 

Bold indicates still active in the competition
The 1st, R32, R16, QF, SF, F, and NC columns indicate how many teams from each conference were in the first round, second round, third round, Quarterfinals, Semifinals, Final, and the National Champion, respectively.

See also 
 2018 NCAA Division I Women's Soccer Tournament
 2018 NCAA Division I men's soccer season

References

External links 
 NCAA Division I Men's College Cup

Championship
NCAA Division I Men's Soccer Tournament seasons
NCAA Division I men's soccer tournament
NCAA Division I men's soccer tournament
NCAA Division I men's soccer tournament